Porta Macedonia (Macedonian: Порта Македонија) is a memorial arch located on Pella Square in Skopje, North Macedonia. Construction started in 2011 and was completed in January 2012.

The arch is 21 meters in height, and cost EUR 4.4 million. Its author is Valentina Stefanovska, sculptor who made several other grandiose monuments from Skopje 2014 project, including the statue dedicated to Alexander the Great officially named "Warrior on a Horse." During the opening ceremony, the Prime Minister Nikola Gruevski admitted that he personally is the instigator of the Skopje 2014 plan.

The arch is dedicated to 20 years of Macedonian independence and its outer surface is covered in 193 m2 of reliefs carved in marble, depicting scenes from the history of Macedonia. It also contains interior rooms, one of which has a function of state-owned souvenir shop, as well as elevators and stairs providing public access to the roof, allegedly intended as space for weddings.

The arch is facing criticism for its high cost. It is designed to match the almost equally tall statue of "Alexander the Great", erected in the capital's central square in summer 2011. Both constructions are part of the government-funded project named "Skopje 2014" with an estimated unofficial price tag €500 million. This considered, many Macedonians believe Porta Macedonia will encourage tourism. The Greek Foreign Ministry has lodged an official complaint to authorities in the Republic of Macedonia following the inauguration of the arch which features images of historical figures including Alexander the Great.

References

Buildings and structures completed in 2012
Buildings and structures in Skopje
Monuments and memorials in North Macedonia
Triumphal arches